Jadopur is a village in Arrah block of Bhojpur district, Bihar, India. As of 2011, its population was 590, in 99 households.

References 

Villages in Bhojpur district, India